Capitellidae is a polychaete worm family in the subclass Scolecida.

Genera 
 Abyssocapitella
 Amastigos
 Anotomastus
 Baldia
 Barantolla
 Branchiocapitella
 Capitella
 Capitellethus
 Capitobranchus
 Dasybranchetus
 Dasybranchus
 Decamastus
 Ditrocha
 Dodecaseta
 Eunotomastus
 Heteromastides
 Heteromastus
 Leiocapitella
 Leiocapitellides
 Leiochrides
 Leiochrus
 Lumbricomastus
 Mastobranchus
 Mediomastus
 Neoheteromastus
 Neomediomastus
 Neonotomastus
 Neopseudocapitella
 Nonatus
 Notodasus
 Notomastus
 Octocapitella
 Paracapitella
 Paraleiocapitella
 Parheteromastides
 Parheteromastus
 Peresiella
 Protomastobranchus
 Pseudocapitella
 Pseudoleiocapitella
 Pseudomastus
 Pseudonotomastus
 Pulliella
 Rashgua
 Scyphoproctus
 Undecimastus

References

External links 

Polychaetes
Taxa named by Adolph Eduard Grube